The men's C-1 1000 metres event was an open-style, individual canoeing event conducted as part of the Canoeing at the 1964 Summer Olympics programme on Lake Sagami, Japan.

The preliminary heats were held on 20 October 1964; 11 competitors entered and were split into two heats of 6 and 5 canoeists.  The top three placers in each heat advanced to the final, while the remaining five entrants had to compete in a semifinal held the next day.  The 2 slowest canoeists were eliminated in the semifinal on 21 October, with the top 3 joining the initial 6 finalists.  The final was held on 22 October, following the 2 individual kayaking event finals but preceding the 4 pairs and fours events.

Medallists

Results

Heats
Top three in each heat move on to final, all others relegated to semifinal.

Semifinal
Only the five canoeists who had not advanced during the first round competed in the semifinal.  The top three of these five received another chance, moving on to the final.  The other two were eliminated.

Final

References
1964 Summer Olympics official report Volume 2, Part 1. pp. 249–50.
Sports-reference.com 1964 C-1 1000 m results.

Men's C-1 1000
Men's events at the 1964 Summer Olympics